Slut Pop is the third extended play (EP) by German singer Kim Petras. It was released on 11 February 2022 through Republic Records, being her first project on the label.

Background 

Kim Petras signed to Republic Records in 2021 and then started to work on new music for her major label debut studio album, as well other musical projects. About the new songs, Petras stated that she explored sexual themes, getting inspired by other artists, citing Britney Spears as an example. The EP process was completed in two months, and the track listing was put together when the singer realized that she had enough songs about the same theme to put on a whole project on its own.

Composition 
A dance-pop EP with influences of tech house and electropop, Slut Pop was described as an "X-rated" album about "slutty, sexual fantasies". According to PopCrush, it features "throbbing beats, dirty lyrics and sex-positive anthems inspired by the sex workers community".

Release and promotion 
In the weeks leading up to Slut Pop release, Petras posted videos teasing its songs on social media, as well stills from a new photoshoot done for the project. To promote the EP, Petras realized a club crawl branded as Slut Tour, during which she performed at multiple nightclubs in one night.

Reception 
The project received a mixed reception. While some critics praised the EP's sex-positive nature, others criticized Petras' association with producer Dr. Luke, who produced the entirety of the EP.

Track listing
All tracks are produced by Dr. Luke.

Personnel
 Kim Petras – vocals
 Dr. Luke – production, programming
 Dale Becker – mastering
 Clint Gibbs – mixing

Charts

Release history

References

2022 EPs
Kim Petras albums
Republic Records EPs
Albums produced by Dr. Luke
Dance-pop EPs